Yunlianghe railway station is a railway station on the Zhengzhou–Kaifeng intercity railway in Kaifeng, Henan, China.

On 10 January 2016, the station was closed due to lack of passengers.

References

Railway stations in Henan
Stations on the Zhengzhou–Kaifeng Intercity Railway
Railway stations in China opened in 2014
Railway stations closed in 2016